The University of Central Florida College of Sciences is the largest academic college of the University of Central Florida located in Orlando, Florida, United States. The dean of the college is Michael Johnson, Ph.D.

The College of Sciences was established in October 2005 after the division of the former College of Arts & Sciences into two separate colleges.  It consists of two divisions: the Division of Natural Sciences and the Division of Social and Behavioral Sciences.  The Division of Natural Sciences is home to the National Center for Forensic Science, while the division of Social and Behavioral Sciences includes the Nicholson School of Communication, one of the largest schools of communication in the nation. The college is also home to the Lou Frey Institute of Politics and Government. In 2007, the college completed construction of a Psychology Building and the second phase of a new Physical Sciences Building is currently under construction.

Organization

Natural Sciences
 Biology
 Chemistry
 Mathematics
 Physics
 Statistics
 Actuarial Sciences

Social and Behavioral Sciences
 Anthropology
 Communication (Nicholson School of Communication)
 Political Science (including Security Studies)
 Psychology
 Sociology

Notes:

References

External links
UCF College of Sciences
University of Central Florida Official Website

Sciences
Educational institutions established in 2005
2005 establishments in Florida